This is a list of all commanders of Space Training and Readiness Command and all its historical antecedents, organizations that took its lineage.

List of commanders

List of deputy commanders

List of senior enlisted leaders

See also
 Space Training and Readiness Command
 Commander of Space Operations Command
 Commander of Space Systems Command

References

United States Space Force generals